Noregs Mållag (literally "Language Organisation of Norway") is the main organisation for Norwegian Nynorsk (New Norwegian), one of the two official written standards of the Norwegian language. In the Norwegian language conflict, it advocates the use of Nynorsk. It has about 12,000 individual members and consists of approximately 200 local groups, including the youth organisation, Norsk Målungdom.

Chairmen/leaders 

The title "chairman" was changed to "leader" in 1982.

* .

See also
 Studentmållaget i Oslo

External links
 Website of Noregs Mållag
 Website of Norsk Målungdom
 nynorsk.no - news about Nynorsk (in Norwegian)

 
Language organisations of Norway